The rivière du Rat Musqué (in English: Muskrat River) flows successively in the municipality of Sainte-Perpétue and in the municipalities of Tourville, in the L'Islet Regional County Municipality, in the administrative region of Chaudière-Appalaches, in Québec, in Canada.

The Musk Rat River is a tributary of the east bank of Grande Rivière, which flows onto the east bank of the Ouelle River which in turn flows into the south shore of the St. Lawrence River at Rivière-Ouelle.

Geography 
The Rivière du Rat Musqué takes its source at Lac du Rat Musqué which is bypassed on the south side by the Canadian National. This source is located in the heart of Notre Dame Mountains at:
  southeast of the south shore of the St. Lawrence River;
  southeast of the center of the village of Saint-Onésime-d'Ixworth;
  northeast of the center of the village of Tourville;
  northeast of the center of the village of Sainte-Perpétue;
  southwest of Lac Sainte-Anne.

  north along more or less the railroad, then north-west, in the municipality of Sainte-Perpétue, to the municipal boundary of Tourville;
  northwesterly in the municipality of Tourville, until its confluence.

The Rat Musqué river meets on the east bank of Grande Rivière.

Toponym 
The toponym Rivière du Rat Musqué was formalized on December 5, 1968, by the Commission de toponymie du Québec.

See also 

 List of rivers of Quebec

References 

Rivers of Chaudière-Appalaches